White Paraguayans or European Paraguayans are Paraguayan people whose ancestry lies within the continent of Europe, most notably Spain, Italy and Germany, and to a lesser extent, Ukraine and Poland.

Paraguayan people of European ancestry mostly descend from people who arrived over the centuries from Spain and Italy. The Paraguayan population is the result of a heterogeneous mixture: mestizos, Creoles, Spanish immigrants, Italians, Germans, indigenous people of Guarani descent and indigenous people from the Pampas, etc. After the War of the Triple Alliance (1864-1870), in which the original Paraguayan population was practically exterminated, the country was repopulated with the help of immigrants, mainly from European and neighboring countries.

European Paraguayans are an important ethnic group representing 20% to 30% of the Paraguayan population. In addition, most of population is mestizo, having mixed European and indigenous ancestry, most of them of Guarani descent.

History 

In the first phase, the Paraguayan population originated with the mass union of indigenous women - mainly those of Guaraní ethnicity - and the Spanish colonizers, who arrived in the 16th century: The Paraguayan people, originated in the crossbreeding of Guaraní and Spanish cultures, was governed for three hundred years under the dominion and colonial dependence of the Kingdom of Spain, with the Spaniards retaining all the rights and privileges that in most cases implied the exploitation of mestizos and natives.

In a second phase, at the end of the War of the Triple Alliance - a dispute that took place between 1864 and 1870, having as protagonists the allies (Argentina, Brazil and Uruguay) against Paraguay - it is estimated that around 50% or more of the original Paraguayan population lost their lives. After this war, and during the course of the 20th century, European immigration (Germans, Spaniards, Italians, French, Russians, Belgians, etc.), added to the high birth rate of the population, contributed to the increase of the Paraguayan population, although in a more modest way compared to its neighboring countries. Recently, in the 1970s, with the construction of the Itaipu hydroelectric power plant, there was another "wave" of immigration, especially from Brazil (mostly of German descent), but also from Asia (Koreans, Taiwanese, Japanese), and from the Arab world (Syrian-Lebanese) to the country.  
Paraguay also had some Ukrainian immigration, although the Ukrainians who settled in Paraguay did so much later compared to those who decided to settle in Brazil, Argentina and Uruguay, whose settlements date back to the end of the 19th century. Polish immigrants arrived in Paraguay before and after World War II. The Itapúa region on the border with Argentina received many Poles, Russians and Ukrainians. Many Poles came from Argentina and others came from Brazil.
 
Paraguay has a history of other settlement, especially in the 20th century: Germans (the majority are Mennonites) with long-time Paraguayan dictator Alfredo Stroessner (President, 1954-1989) himself of German ancestry; Italians (around 40% of the total Paraguayan population is of full or partial Italian descent); Japanese with Okinawans; Koreans; Chinese; Arabs; Poles; Southern Europeans; Jews; Brazilians; and Argentines are among those who have settled in Paraguay.

Numbers

Census data
The General Directorate of Statistics, Surveys and Censuses (DGEEC), the institution in charge of censuses in Paraguay, does not include the concepts of race in its surveys and only registers those people who belong to one of the officially recognized indigenous peoples. According to the 2012 Census, Indigenous people totaled 112,848 people, corresponding to 1.68% of the country's total population.

See also 

 White Latin American 
Italians in Paraguay 
Germans in Paraguay 
English people in Paraguay 
Ukrainians in Paraguay 
Polish Paraguayan 
Australian Paraguayans
History of the Jews in Paraguay

References 

Demographics of Paraguay
Ethnic groups in Paraguay
European diaspora in South America
White culture in South America